This is a list of films which placed number one at the weekly box office in the United States during 1955 per Variety's weekly National Boxoffice Survey. The results are based on a sample of 20-25 key cities and therefore, any box office amounts quoted may not be the total that the film grossed nationally in the week.

Number-one films

Highest-grossing films
The top-grossing hits of 1955 in the United States.

See also
 List of American films — American films by year
 Lists of box office number-one films

References

Chronology

1955
1955 in American cinema
1955-related lists